Buenoa is a genus of backswimmer. It was created by George Willis Kirkaldy in 1904 to include all species of Anisops from the Western Hemisphere with a two-segmented front tarsus in males, reserving the latter genus for Eastern Hemisphere species with a one-segmented front tarsus in males. It contains 69 described species.

Species
 Buenoa absidata Truxal, 1953
 Buenoa albida (Champion, 1901)
 Buenoa alterna Truxal, 1953
 Buenoa amazona Padilla-Gil, 2003
 Buenoa amnigenoidea Nieser, 1970
 Buenoa amnigenopsis Nieser, 1975
 Buenoa amnigenus (White, 1879)
 Buenoa analoga Padilla-Gil, 2012
 Buenoa anomala Padilla-Gil, 2010
 Buenoa antigone (Kirkaldy, 1899)
 Buenoa arida Truxal, 1953
 Buenoa arizonis Bare, 1931
 Buenoa artafrons Truxal, 1953
 Buenoa burtsa Padilla-Gil, 2010
 Buenoa communis Truxal, 1953
 Buenoa confusa Truxal, 1953
 Buenoa crassipes (Champion, 1901)
 Buenoa dactylis Padilla-Gil, 2010
 Buenoa deplanatylus Barbosa & Nessimian, 2013
 Buenoa dilaticrus Barbosa, Nessimian & Ferreira-Keppler, 2010
 Buenoa distincta Truxal, 1953
 Buenoa elegans (Fieber, 1851)
 Buenoa excavata Truxal, 1953
 Buenoa exilidens Barbosa, Nessimian & Ferreira-Keppler, 2010
 Buenoa fasciata Nieser, 1970
 Buenoa femoralis (Fieber, 1851)
 Buenoa fittkaul Nieser, 1970
 Buenoa funensis Padilla-Gil, 2010
 Buenoa fuscipennis (Berg, 1879)
 Buenoa gracilis Truxal, 1953
 Buenoa hungerfordi Truxal, 1953
 Buenoa ida Kirkaldy, 1904
 Buenoa incompta Truxal, 1953
 Buenoa konta Nieser & Pelli, 1994
 Buenoa limnocastoris Hungerford, 1923
 Buenoa machrisi Truxal, 1957
 Buenoa macrophthalma (Fieber, 1851)
 Buenoa macrotibialis Hungerford, 1924
 Buenoa macrotrichia Truxal, 1953
 Buenoa marki Reichart, 1971
 Buenoa margaritacea Torre-Bueno, 1908
 Buenoa mutabilis Truxal, 1953
 Buenoa nieseri Padilla-Gil, 2003
 Buenoa nitida Truxal, 1953 (Synonym: Buenoa doesburgi Nieser, 1968)
 Buenoa oculata Truxal, 1953
 Buenoa omeri Truxal, 1953
 Buenoa oreia Nieser, Melo, Pelli & Barbosa, 1997
 Buenoa pallens (Champion, 1901)
 Buenoa pallipes (Fabricius, 1803)
 Buenoa paranensis Jaczewski, 1928
 Buenoa penta Padilla-Gil, 2012
 Buenoa platycnemis (Fieber, 1851)
 Buenoa prosthetus Padilla-Gil, 2010
 Buenoa pseudomutabilis Barbosa, Ribeiro & Nessimian, 2010
 Buenoa rostra Truxal, 1953
 Buenoa salutis Kirkaldy, 1904
 Buenoa scimitra Bare, 1925
 Buenoa serrana Angrisano, 1983
 Buenoa speciosa Truxal, 1953
 Buenoa tarsalis Truxal, 1953
 Buenoa thomasi Truxal, 1953
 Buenoa tibialis Truxal, 1957
 Buenoa triangularis Truxal, 1957
 Buenoa truxali Nieser, 1968
 Buenoa tumaquensis Padilla-Gil, 2010
 Buenoa uhleri Truxal, 1953
 Buenoa unguis Truxal, 1953
 Buenoa uselus Padilla-Gil, 2010

References

Nepomorpha genera
Notonectidae
Insects described in 1904
Taxa named by George Willis Kirkaldy